Pterostylis timorensis is a plant in the orchid family Orchidaceae and is endemic to East Timor. Both flowering and non-flowering plants have a rosette of light green, fleshy leaves. Flowering plants have a single green, white and reddish-brown flower and two or three stem leaves.

Description
Pterostylis timorensis, is a terrestrial,  perennial, deciduous, herb with an underground tuber. The dorsal sepal and petals are joined to form a hood called the "galea" over the column. The galea is white with green and reddish-brown lines.

Taxonomy and naming
Pterostylis timorensis was first formally described in 2008 by André Schuiteman and Jaap J. Vermeulen from a specimen collected on Monte Mundo Perdido and the description was published in the Botanical Journal of the Linnean Society. The specific epithet (timorensis) refers to the distribution of this species with the Latin suffix -ensis meaning "place for" or "where".

Distribution and habitat

References

timorensis
Flora of East Timor
Plants described in 2008